The Burgess Branch is a tributary of the Missisquoi River, crossing the municipalities of Eden (Lamoille County) and Lowell in Orleans County, Vermont, United States.

The lower part of the Burgess Branch is accessible by Valley Road (south-east side of the river); the intermediary part, by Lamphere Road (mainly on south-east side); the upper part is served mainly by Mines Road.

The surface of the Burgess Branch is usually frozen from mid-December to mid-March, except the rapids areas; however, safe circulation on the ice is generally from late December to early March.

Geography 
The Burgess Branch takes its source at the mouth of a little lake in the municipality of Eden. This lake is encased between Knob Mountain (on south side - summit reach ), Hadley Mountain (north-east side - summit reach ) and Belvidere Mountain (north-west side - summit reach ). This source of the river is located at:
  south of the limite between Lamoille County and Orleans County, Vermont;
  north-west of Lake Eden.

  towards the north by crossing successively an unidentified lake, a little lake which receives the discharge (coming from the south-east) from an unidentified stream, then the Corez Pond, to its mouth. Note: The mouth of Corez Pond corresponds to the limit between Lamoille County and Orleans County, Vermont;
  north at first in an encased valley, then crossing a plain, to the discharge (coming from west) of an unidentified lake;
  north, then branching north-east in encased valley, receiving the discharge (coming from the north-west) of two unidentified brook, and crossing a march area, up to the discharge of Lockwood Brook (coming from north-west);
  north-east, up to a brook (coming from south-east);
  north-east in encased valley, forming a little loop toward east, up to a brook (coming from north-west);
  north-east in encased valley, crossing Hazens Notch Road, up to its mouth.

The Burgess Branch empties into the Missisquoi River, at the route 58 bridge. This point is the head of Missisquoi River.

The mouth of the Burgess Branch is located at:
  north-west of the center of Lowell, Vermont;
  south of the Canada-US border;
  east of lake Champlain.

Toponymy 
The toponym "Burgess Branch" was registered on October 29, 1980 in the USGS (US Geological Survey).

References

See also 

 List of rivers of Vermont

Orleans County, Vermont
Lamoille County, Vermont
Rivers of Vermont